Siddhatek is a town in the Ahmednagar district of the western part of India located on the Bhima River. The town is known for its temple to Sri Siddhi Vināyaka, the right-tusked incarnation of Ganesha as "Masterful Remover". Legends surrounding the north-facing temple suggest it was built to commemorate the place where Lord Vishnu defeated the evil Asuras Madhu-Kaitabh with the blessing of Siddhi Vināyaka. The shrine is particularly popular during the festivals of Ganesh Jayanti, Vijayadashami and Somvati Amavasya.

Notes

Sources

Hindu temples in Maharashtra
Cities and towns in Ahmednagar district